Ohgahora Dam is a gravity dam located in Gifu Prefecture in Japan. The dam is used for flood control and water supply. The catchment area of the dam is 4.4 km2. The dam impounds about 4  ha of land when full and can store 450 thousand cubic meters of water. The construction of the dam was started on 1988 and completed in 1998.

References

Dams in Gifu Prefecture